Nsanje Airport  is an airport serving the town of Nsanje, Republic of Malawi. The airport is within the town limits.

See also
Transport in Malawi
List of airports in Malawi

References

 Google Earth

External links
Nsanje Airport
OurAirports - Nsanje
OpenStreetMap - Nsanje

Airports in Malawi
Buildings and structures in Southern Region, Malawi